Miguel Robédé (born June 30, 1981) is a former Canadian football defensive tackle. He was drafted with the first overall pick in the 2005 CFL Draft by the Calgary Stampeders. He played NCAA football for the Hurricanes of the University of Miami in 2001 and CIS Football with Laval University.

On May 19, 2011 Robédé was traded to the Toronto Argonauts, along with wide receiver P.K. Sam, for wide receiver Reggie McNeal and defensive lineman Adrian Davis.

On June 22, 2011 Robédé was released by the Toronto Argonauts.

References

External links
Calgary Stampeders bio

1981 births
Living people
Toronto Argonauts players
Canadian football defensive linemen
Laval Rouge et Or football players
People from Val-d'Or
Players of Canadian football from Quebec